The Fire and Rescue Department (FRD),  (JBP), Jawi: جابتن بومبا دان ڤڽلامت, also known as Brunei Fire and Rescue Department (BFRD), ( – JBPB) is a government agency of Brunei Darussalam, responsible for firefighting, animal rescue, and technical rescue.  Bomba is a Malay word derived from the Portuguese bombeiros, which means 'firefighters'.  The department's main headquarters are located at Bandar Seri Begawan, in the Brunei-Muara District of the Sultanate of Brunei.

It is the primary and main public service firefighting force in Brunei, though there are other firefighting units run by other government agencies.  Furthermore, there are additional private firefighting entities, such as the BSP Fire and Emergency Response service operated by Brunei Shell Petroleum (BSP), which own fire stations (along with firefighting vehicles and emergency ambulances) located at Anduki Airfield and Panaga, Belait District.  Moreover, they also owned a single Sikorsky S-92 for search and rescue (SaR) operations.

995 is the emergency telephone number used to contact the Fire and Rescue service in Brunei.

History
The Fire Service was originally formed under the Administration of the Royal Brunei Police Force (RBPF) in order to preserve peace and stability.  On , the Fire Brigade was officially fully established independent from the RBPF.  After the formation, 36 police officers, including an Inspector were either permanently or temporarily transferred to the newly established brigade; Inspector Mohammad became the first Superintendent of Fire Brigade.  Despite being independent form the RBPF, the Fire Act 1966 was still kept, until the Amendment of the Fire Services Act 2002 came into force.

The Fire Supply was formed in mid-, in which Lam Soo Man, an officer loaned from the Hong Kong Fire Service was selected to be the Fire Inspector of the Brunei State Fire Brigade until 1969.  On , the Fire Services Enactment was passed and put into service.  In 1968, the Government of Brunei commenced a project to build a fire station in Tutong, on the river bank of the Tutong river.  Since the establishment of the Fire Supply, officers have been loaned from Hong Kong and United Kingdom until 1980.  The first local commander Dato Paduka Awang Haji Yaakob bin haji Mohd Yussof, was entrusted in 1981.

More than B$1.3 million cost in damage caused by fires was recorded by the FRD during the first quarter of 2007. In , the Sungai Liang Industrial Park (SPARK) fire station, Sungai Liang was designed and constructed in a collaboration with the FRD.

List of fire stations

Equipment

Land vehicles

Marine vehicles

References

External links

Fire-Rescue.gov.bn — official government website
Gallery of images of Brunei firefighting vehicles — from 111emergency.co.nz

1960 establishments in Brunei
Brunei